"" is the 11th single by Zard and released 2 February 1994 under B-Gram Records label. The single debuted at #1 rank first week. It charted for 15 weeks and sold over 887,000 copies.

Track list
All songs are written by Izumi Sakai and arranged by Masao Akashi

composer: Tetsurō Oda
the song was used in Fuji TV drama Ai to Giwaku no Suspense as opening song
Boy
composer: Seiichiro Kuribayashi
the song was used in Yomiuri TV program Natsu no Niwa The Friends as ending song
(original karaoke)
Boy (original karaoke)

References

1994 singles
Zard songs
Songs written by Izumi Sakai
Songs written by Tetsurō Oda
Oricon Weekly number-one singles
1994 songs